Kopili River is an interstate river in Northeast India that flows through the states of Meghalaya and Assam and is the largest south bank tributary of the Brahmaputra in Assam.

Course 
The Kopili originates in the Meghalaya plateau and flows through Central Assam and the hill districts of Assam before its confluence with the Brahmaputra. In Assam it drains the districts of Karbi Anglong, Dima Hasao, Kamrup and Nagaon.

Waterworks 
Completed in 1975, the Kopili Flow Irrigation Scheme in Kamrup district irrigates  of land across 14 revenue villages and facilitates paddy cultivation. The Kopili Hydro Electric Project, located across the districts of Dima Hasao in Assam and Jaintia Hills in Meghalaya and run by the North Eastern Electric Power Corporation, consists of the Khandong and Umrongso dams and their reservoirs and three power houses that have a total installed capacity of 275 MW.

Environmental issues 
The Kopili has as many as 54 species of fish in it. Unscientific opencast coal mining in the Kopili's upper reaches in Meghalaya has led to acidification of the river which has in turn left part of the river's course biologically dead, making the water unfit for human consumption and has led to frequent outages at the Kopili Hydro Electric Project's power stations. The 275 MW Kopili Dam Power House of NEEPCO (North Eastern Electric Power Corporation Limited) in Assam suffered major disaster on 7 Oct 2019. The penstock pipe that takes water from the Umrangso dam to the hydropower house burst during early hours in Assam’s Dima Hasao district, and massive quantity of water erupted, a lot of it entered the power house, where four employees of NEEPCO were feared to have been trapped/ washed away.

References 

Rivers of Meghalaya
Rivers of Assam
Tributaries of the Brahmaputra River
Karbi Anglong district
Rivers of India